The Roman Catholic Archdiocese of Kuching is a Metropolitan Latin archbishopric of the Roman Catholic Church in Sarawak, a Malaysian state on Borneo, however remains dependent on the missionary Roman Congregation for the Evangelization of Peoples.

Its cathedral archiepiscopal see is in St Joseph's Cathedral, in Kuching, Sarawak.

Former auxiliary bishop Simon Peter Poh Hoon Seng was appointed Archbishop of Kuching by Pope Francis on 4 March 2017 following John Ha Tiong Hock's resignation.

Erected in 1927 by Pope Pius VI as an Apostolic Prefecture, Kuching was elevated to Metropolitan Archdiocese by Pope Paul VI in 1976 with the suffragan dioceses of Sibu and Miri.

History 
 It was erected it as the Apostolic Prefecture of Sarawak by Pope Pius XI on 5 February 1927, on territory split off from the Apostolic Prefecture of Labuan and Borneo.
 It was promoted to the Apostolic Vicariate of Kuching by Pope Pius XII on 14 February 1952. 
 Lost territory on 1959.12.19 to establish the Apostolic Vicariate of Miri (now its senior suffragan see of separated Apostolic Vicariate of Brunei Darussalam and Diocese of Miri).
 Pope Paul VI elevated it to the rank  of a metropolitan archdiocese on 31 May 1976.
 Lost territory on 1986.12.22 to establish the Diocese of Sibu as its second suffragan (by the installation of Dominic Su Haw Chiu as its first bishop).

Ecclesiastical Province 
Its ecclesiastical province comprises the Metropolitan's own Archbishopric and the following  suffragan sees, both daughter dioceses : 
 Roman Catholic Diocese of Miri
 Roman Catholic Diocese of Sibu.

Bishops 

The following are the lists of ordinaries (bishops of the diocese) and auxiliary bishops, and their terms of service. They are followed by other priest of this diocese who became bishop.

Apostolic Prefects of Sarawak 
 Edmund Dunn, MHM (1927–1935)
 Aloysius Hopfgartner, MHM (1935–1949)
 Jan Vos, MHM (Born in The Netherlands; 1949–1952); elevated to Apostolic Vicar

Apostolic Vicars of Sarawak 
 Jan Vos, MHM (1952–1968)
 Charles Reiterer, MHM (1968–1974)
 Dato' Sri Peter Chung Hoan Ting (1975–1976), elevated to Archbishop

Archbishops of Kuching 
 Dato' Sri Peter Chung Hoan Ting (1976–2003)
 Dato John Ha Tiong Hock (2003–2017)
 Simon Peter Poh Hoon Seng (2017–present)

Former Auxiliary Bishops of Kuching 
 Dato John Ha Tiong Hock (1998–2003), appointed Archbishop of this diocese
 Simon Peter Poh Hoon Seng (2015–2017), appointed Archbishop of this diocese

Other priest of this diocese who became bishop 
 Richard Ng, appointed Bishop of Miri in 2013

Ordained priests
  Msgr. William Sabang
  Rev. Fr. Adrian Kho
  Rev. Fr. Albert Jacobse, MHM
  Rev. Fr. Alvin Ng, SJ 
  Rev. Fr. Arockyaraj Pavulu, CMF
  Rev. Fr. Augustine Jepy
  Rev. Fr. Bernard Jim Bujang
  Rev. Fr. Berchmans Rayar, CMF
  Rev. Fr. Christopher Laden
  Rev. Fr. David Au, OFM
  Rev. Fr. Davie Entalai
  Rev. Fr. Don Don Romero Ramerez, OFM 
  Rev. Fr. Eugenio Gocela Maglasang, SDB
  Rev. Fr. Felix Au
  Rev. Fr. Francis Dakun
  Rev. Fr. Galvin Richard Ngumbang
  Rev. Fr. Henry Jimbey 
  Rev. Fr. Jerome Juleng
  Rev. Fr. John Chong
  Rev. Fr. John Ekly Direk
  Rev. Fr. Joseph Chai
  Rev. Fr. Joseph Lee, OFM
  Rev. Fr. Joseph Liew
  Rev. Fr. Joseph Ng, SJ
  Rev. Fr. Larry Tan Cheong Kee, SJ
  Rev. Fr. Lazarus Swinie
  Rev. Fr. Leonard Yap
  Rev. Fr. Lucas Ng, CDD
  Rev. Fr. Mark Noel Bunchol
  Rev. Fr. Martin Wong
  Rev. Fr. Nicholas Ng
  Rev. Fr. Patrick Heng
  Rev. Fr. Paul Herry
  Rev. Fr. Paul Hu Pi Xian, CDD
  Rev. Fr. Paul Ling Keh Yiing
  Rev. Fr. Peter Liston
  Rev. Fr. Pratap Baskey, CMF
  Rev. Fr. Prince Carneelyes Arockiam, CMF
  Rev. Fr. Ramon Borja, SDB
  Rev. Fr. Robert Jissem
  Rev. Fr. Stanley Goh, SJ
  Rev. Fr. Stephen Chin
  Rev. Fr. Stephen Lim
  Rev. Fr. Vincent Chin

Deceased priests 
  Rev. Fr. Terence Burke,  MHM (1944 - 2017)
  Rev. Fr. James Meehan, MHM (1933 - 2018)
  Rev. Fr. Peter Aichner, MHM (1914 - 1995)
  Rev. Fr. Leopold van Rooyen, MHM  (1917 - 2008)
  Rev. Fr. Joachim Pang (1921 - 2007)
  Rev. Fr. Richard Khoo Choon Phoe (1940 - 2016)
  Rev. Fr. Dato Lawrence Chua (1936 - 2021)
  Rev. Fr. Michael O'Brien, MHM (1941 - 2022)
  Rev. Fr. Noel Hanrahan, MHM (1928 - 2019)

Statistics and extent 
As per 2021, it pastorally served 240,575 Catholics (38.2% of 812,900 total) on 19,173 km² in 12 parishes with 37 priests (26 diocesan, 11 religious), 82 lay religious (13 brothers, 69 sisters), 5 seminarians. There is a major seminary of St. Peter.

There are about 19 parishes and chapels administering outstations around the archdiocese.

Parishes 
 St. Joseph's Cathedral, Kuching (Priest in charge: Rev. Bernard Jim Bujang, Rev. Larry Tan Cheong Kee, SJ, Rev. Galvin Richard Ngumbang & Rev. Mark Noel Bunchol)
 St. Peter's Church, Padungan (Priest in charge: Rev. Vincent Chin)
 St. Ann's Church, Kota Padawan (Priest in charge: Rev. Don Don Romero Ramerez, OFM & Rev. David Au, OFM)
 St Teresa's Church, Serian (Priest in charge: Rev. Leonard Yap, Rev. Arockyaraj Pavulu, CMF, Rev. Pratap Baskey, CMF & Rev. Robert Jissem)
 St. Stephen's Church, Bau (Priest in charge: Rev. Peter Liston, Rev. Paul Herry & Rev. Augustine Jepy)
 St. Jude's Church, Bunan Gega (Priest in charge: Rev. Berchmans Rayar, CMF, Rev. John Ekly Direk & Rev. Prince Carneelyes Arockiam, CMF)
 Sacred Heart Church, Kota Sentosa (Priest in charge: Rev. Felix Au, Rev. Lucas Ng, CDD, Rev. Paul Hu, CDD & Rev. Stephen Chin)
 Blessed Sacrament Church, BDC (Priest in charge: Rev. Patrick Heng)
 Holy Spirit Church, Lundu (Priest in charge: Rev. Adrian Kho & Rev. Christopher Laden)
 Holy Trinity Church, Kenyalang Park (Priest in charge: Rev. Joseph Liew & Rev. Eugenio Gocela Maglasang, SDB)
 Chapel of Mother Mary, Stutong (Priest in charge: Msgr. William Sabang & Rev. Martin Wong)
 Our Lady Queen of Peace, Sri Aman (Priest in charge: Rev. Jerome Juleng, Rev. Joseph Chai & Rev. Henry Jimbey)

Religious communities

Male 
 Mill Hill Missionaries (MHM)
 Congregation of the Disciples of the Lord (CDD)
 Marist Brothers (FMS)
 Society of Jesus (SJ)
 Claretians (CMF)
 Order of Friars Minor (OFM)
 Salesians of Don Bosco (SDB)

Female 
 Discalced Carmelites (OCD)
 Sisters of St. Francis of Sarawak (SSFS)

See also 
 List of Catholic dioceses in Malaysia
 Roman Catholicism in Malaysia

References

Sources and external links
 GCatholic.org, with Google map and satellite photo - data for all sections
 
 Catholic-Hierarchy

Religious organizations established in 1927
Kuching
Roman Catholic dioceses in Malaysia
Roman Catholic dioceses and prelatures established in the 20th century